() is a county-level city in Zhejiang Province, China, and under the jurisdiction of Jiaxing. It is in the south side of Yangtze River Delta, and in the north of Zhejiang. To its south lies the Qiantang River. Haining is known for its leather industry and spectacular tide in the Qiantang River. Since june 2021, it's linked to Hangzhou by the new suburban Hangzhou - Haining subway Line.

Basic Facts
Located in the YRD region close to Shanghai and adjoining Hangzhou, Haining serves as the core of the Hangzhou Metropolitan Economic Circle and the Greater Hangzhou Bay Rim Area. The city benefits from the “one-hour economic circle” of Shanghai, Hangzhou and Suzhou with a well-developed transportation network.

Haining has been promoting integrated development between traditional and emerging industries, resulting in two 100 billion RMB-worth industry clusters centered on fashion and strategic new industries respectively. Based on key industrial development platforms such as “Three Zones and One Belt” and distinctive towns, Haining keeps strengthening industry clustering and upgrading the cross-sector industry clusters into larger innovation-driven ones.

In 2018, the International Campus of Zhejiang University was opened in the Eastern Part of Haining, with several institutes that offer joint education programs in life sciences and engineering, together with the University of Edinburgh or the University of Illinois Urbana-Champaign. The vicinity of an academic institution for education and research is believed to foster the growth of engineering and biotech companies for which a "science park" is currently under construction.

Long known as the land of fish and rice, the home of silk and leather, and a place of rich cultural heritage and scenery, Haining, a typical water-bred city in southern China. Haining is the birthplace of Wang Guowei, a scholar of Chinese literature, Xu Zhimo, a Romantic poet, Jin Yong, a novelist of the martial arts genre, Li Shanlan, a mathematician, and Jiang Baili, a military theorist, among others.

History
In May 1949, Haining County was occupied by the Communist Army. In June 1949, the county government was relocated to Xiashi Town. In October 1958, Haiyan County was merged into Haining. In December 1961, Haiyan County was re-established. In November 1986, Haining County was elevated to Haining City, under jurisdiction of Jiaxing. Throughout history, Yanguan Town had long served as the seat of county government. During Second Sino-Japanese War, the county seat was moved to Yuanhua Town and even outside the county. After the war, the county government was formed in Xiashi Town.

Administrative divisions
Subdistricts:
Xiashi Subdistrict, Haizhou Subdistrict, Haichang Subdistrict, Maqiao Subdistrict

Towns:
Xucun, Chang'an, Yanguan, Xieqiao, Yuanhua, Dingqiao, Huangwan, Zhouwangmiao

Economic Development
During the 12th Five-Year Plan period, Haining's GDP grew at a compound annual growth rate of 8.24%, ranking the first in Jiaxing. In 2016, its GDP reached RMB 74.41 billion, an increase of 6.4% over the previous year, which accounts for 19.8% of the total GDP of Jiaxing, with per capita GDP of RMB 109,600, 1.34 times as much as that of Jiaxing. In 2016, the industrial structure of Haining was increasingly optimized towards one that the tertiary industry accounts for the largest percentage and the primary industry the smallest. The value added of the secondary industry of the city was RMB 32.68 billion in 2016, playing a dominant role with a percentage of 53.5% among the three levels of industries; and the tertiary industry which saw a rapid growth, accounted for 43.9%, representing 55.6% of the GDP growth.

In recent years, Haining has adopted a project- driven model for industrial development, and kept promoting the launch of major real economy projects, with a view to providing strong support for industrial transformation. In 2016, the total output value of industrial enterprises with an annual revenue of RMB 20 million or more increased by 3.6% to RMB 145.6 billion, with the value added reaching 28.05 billion RMB, up by 5.2%. In 2016, the fixed asset investment in Haining was RMB 55.54 billion, an increase of 8.0% over the previous year. The productive investment in the city reached RMB 25.23 billion, rising by 11.1%, with the proportion in the total fixed asset investment increasing to 45.42% from 44.16%, leading to an increasingly optimized investment structure. With the transformation and upgrading of industrial clusters, Haining has witnessed an increasing demand for investment in technical reformation.

Culture
Haining is famous for its leather-silhouette show (also known as shadow play), colored lanterns, and tidal bore viewing. 
Haining began to be inhabited as early as the New Stone Age some 6,000 years ago. During the Spring and Autumn period (770-476BC), it became part of the State of the Wu and then belonged to the State of the Yue before coming under the State of the Chu. In 221BC, during the Qin Dynasty, it fell under the jurisdiction of Changshui County (present-day Jiaxing). In 223AD, or the second year of the reign of Wu State King Huangwu of the Three Kingdoms period, it became known as Yanguan County. In 1295, or the first year of the reign of Yuan Emperor Yuanzheng, the county was promoted to be Yuanguan Prefecture. It became Haining Prefecture in 558. As the sea often encroached upon the prefecture via the Qiantangjiang River, the area was renamed Haining Prefecture in 1329 in the hope of calming the waves (in Chinese, “hai” means sea and “ning” to calm or pacify), and it remains so today. Following the founding the PRC, the area became Haining County, and then Haining City in November 1986 with the approval of the State Council.

Industry
Haining has developed as a city well known for its quality leather products and textiles.

Transportation
The Hangzhou–Haining intercity railway opened in June 2021 and it connects Haining with nearby Hangzhou.

Weather
Haining was positioned on the center line of the total solar eclipse on Wednesday, July 22, 2009.  For the event, the local weather was mostly cloudy, but substantial viewers were on hand to witness it.

People from Haining
 Gu Kuang, Tang Dynasty poet
 Wang Guowei, scholar in Chinese literature
 Li Shanlan, Qing Dynasty mathematician
 Jiang Baili, a politician of the Republic of China
 Xu Zhimo, early 20th-century poet
 Jin Yong, an influential modern Chinese-language novelist
 Bao Tong, former Chinese Communist Party politician
 Zhu Junyi, disgraced government official
 Jiang Ying, Chinese opera singer, music teacher and the wife of Chinese rocket scientist Qian Xuesen

References

Research Report on the Investment Environment of Haining City made by Deloitte in 2016

 
County-level cities in Zhejiang
Jiaxing